Steaua București is a Romanian professional association football club based in Bucharest. The club was formed in Bucharest in 1947 at the initiative of several officers of the Romanian Royal House as Asociația Sportivă a Armatei București, before being renamed as Clubul Sportiv Central al Armatei București in 1948. The club was renamed a third time in 1950 as Casa Centrală a Armatei București and in 1961 as Clubul Sportiv al Armatei Steaua București. The team name was changed last time in 1998 following lobbying from the football department president, Marcel Pușcaș, and new LPF regulations, the football club separated from CSA Steaua București and changed their name for the last time to Fotbal Club Steaua București

The team that Steaua have played most in league competition is Dinamo București, who they first met in the 1948–49 Divizia A season; the 45 defeats from 132 meetings is more than they have lost against any other club. Also, Dinamo have drawn 46 league encounters with Steaua, more than any other club. Steaua have recorded more league victories against Universitatea Cluj than against any other club, having beaten them 59 times out of 96 attempts.

On 9 March 2014 Steaua played their 2000 match in league against CFR Cluj, in a 1–0 away victory.

All-time league record
Statistics correct as of matches played on season 2015–16.

References
General

Specific

League record by opponent
Romanian football club league records by opponent